The Bay of Islands Vintage Railway Trust (BOIVRT) is a heritage railway in Kawakawa, in Northland, New Zealand. The railway operates on part of the former Opua Branch railway.

History
The railway was formed as the Bay of Islands Scenic Railway, a private company, in 1985 following the withdrawal of New Zealand Railways Corporation services beyond Otiria. The service began with J 1211, a hired J class locomotive that was brought from Wellington and is now owned by Mainline Steam. The railway proved popular with tourists, and in the summer seasons of 1985–86 and 1986–87, J 1211 was used to haul three return trains a day. The locomotive did not return for the 1987–88 season because of the Ferrymead 125 year celebrations that year and because it used two and a half tons of coal a day, compared to a Peckett locomotive using only one ton a day, which replaced the J1211.

In May 1987, the directors of the Bay of Islands Scenic Railway decided to cease operations due to financial problems. The group was reformed as a preservation society, the Opua-Kawakawa Railway Preservation Society Incorporated. The Taumarere Northland Railway Trust was formed around the same time.

Bay of Islands Vintage Railway Limited, a joint venture between the Society and the Trust, was incorporated in 1995 with the Society owning the locomotives, rolling stock, sheds and miscellaneous equipment and the Trust owning the track and leasing the rail corridor and the Kawakawa station building from New Zealand Rail Limited (later Tranz Rail). The railway continued operations until 2001 when the Land Transport Safety Authority withdrew the line's operating licence.

The rail line between Opua and Taumamere is currently part of the Twin Coast Cycle Trail with gravel laid over the sleepers and rails.

There is an active campaign to restore the railway, including the rebuilding of the locomotives, refurbishment of passenger carriages, and upgrading the line to safe standards. Currently, operations cover  of track, including the famous stretch along Kawakawa's main street. The railway is now opened as far as Taumarere, having passed a safety audit on a bridge before the station. The group is currently raising funds to restore bridge No. 9 on the line and repair the Whangae Tunnel, then on to Opua.

The terminus in Opua is on land now owned by Far North Holdings, the trading arm of Far North District Council, and negotiations are underway for trains to return to Opua.

Operations

The Bay of Islands Vintage Railway runs throughout the year. As of May 2010, it runs on Friday, Saturday and Sunday and every day during school and public holidays at 10.45am, 12 noon, 1.15pm and 2.30pm –  the round trip takes approximately 45 minutes. Passengers may leave the train at Taumarere and catch a later train back to Kawakawa.

For most of the year, ‘Gabriel the Steam Engine’ is used on Saturdays and Sundays, and ‘Fredrick the Diesel Engine’ is used on Fridays, although this varies depending on public and school holidays and availability of personnel and maintenance.  On school holidays ‘Gabriel the Steam Engine’ is used on Fridays, in place of ‘Fredrick the Diesel Engine’, Saturdays, Sundays and Mondays, with ‘Fredrick the Diesel Engine’ being used on Tuesdays, Wednesdays and Thursdays.

Motive power

See also
 List of New Zealand railway museums and heritage lines

References

Citations

Bibliography

External links
 Bay of Islands Vintage Railway website

Heritage railways in New Zealand
Far North District
Tourist attractions in the Northland Region
Rail transport in the Northland Region
Bay of Islands